Isakovo is a rural locality (a village) in Yurovskoye Rural Settlement, Gryazovetsky District, Vologda Oblast, Russia. The population was 9 as of 2002. One of the earliest appearance of pottery has been found in Isakovo, alongside flint and bone tools (arrowheads, knives, points, half-ground adzes). Pointed-based pots in Isakovo probably were copies of similarly shaped baskets. The period of the artifacts and pottery may reach back to about 4000 BC.

Geography 
Isakovo is located 43 km northwest of Gryazovets (the district's administrative centre) by road. Zakharovo is the nearest rural locality.

References 

Rural localities in Gryazovetsky District